Erfan Amiri (born 16 March 1990) is an Iranian freestyle wrestler. In 2005, he won his first Asian Youth Wrestling Championship in Tokyo, Japan, and in the following year,  he won the Asian Youth Championships of Thailand 2006. In 2009, he won a gold medal in the Asian championships in the Philippines and a gold medal in the junior world championship in Ankara. He won a World Junior Bronze Medal in Budapest, Hungary in 2010. In the same year, he became a member of the adult Iranian national team and won fifth place at the World Championships in Moscow 2010. In 2011, he won a bronze medal at the Zilowski Grand Prix and a silver medal at the Tashkent Asian Adult championships. In 2012, he won a bronze medal at the Asian Adult championships in Gumi, became the national champion of Iran, and won the Iranian Premier League.

References 

Living people
Iranian male sport wrestlers
1990 births
21st-century Iranian people